Bonamia oblongifolia is a plant in the family Convolvulaceae.

The perennial herb or shrub blooms in February and produces blue flowers.

It is found in a few scattered locations in the Kimberley regions of Western Australia where it grows in sandy-rocky soils.

References

oblongifolia
Plants described in 1968